Regentog (also known as Ragantak, Regen Tok, and Regentok) is a village in Birk Rural District, in the Central District of Mehrestan County, Sistan and Baluchestan Province, Iran. At the 2006 census, its population was 470, in 101 families.

References 

Populated places in Mehrestan County